Cheshire East Council elections are held every four years. Cheshire East Council is the local authority for the unitary authority of Cheshire East in Cheshire, England. Since the last boundary changes in 2011, 82 councillors have been elected from 52 wards.

Political control
Cheshire East was created on 1 April 2009 replacing Congleton, Crewe and Nantwich, Macclesfield and Cheshire County Council. The first election to the new council was held in 2008, initially operating as a shadow authority before coming into its powers on 1 April 2009. Political control of the council since 2009 has been held by the following parties:

Leadership
The first leader of the council, Wesley Fitzgerald, had been the last leader of Macclesfield Borough Council. The leaders of Cheshire East Council since 2009 have been:

Council elections
2008 Cheshire East Council election
2011 Cheshire East Council election (new ward boundaries)
2015 Cheshire East Council election
2019 Cheshire East Council election

District result maps

Changes between elections

By-elections

Changes of affiliation 
Michael Jones (Bunbury) left the Conservative Party in September 2017. His later resignation from the council triggered the by-election on 22 March 2018.

References

External links
By-election results 
Cheshire East Council

 
Borough of Cheshire East
Council elections in Cheshire
Unitary authority elections in England